Ziarat Mowla (also Romanized as  Zīārat Mowlá; also known as Khar Bandān and Kharbandavān) is a village in Gurband Rural District, in the Central District of Minab County, Hormozgan Province, Iran. At the 2006 census, its population was 269, in 50 families.

References 

Populated places in Minab County